Choe Yong-gon (21 June 1900 – 19 September 1976) was the Supreme Commander of the Korean People's Army from 1948 to 1950, North Korean defence minister from 1948 to 1957, and the Chairman of the Standing Committee of the Supreme People's Assembly of the Democratic People's Republic of Korea of the Supreme People's Assembly of North Korea from 1957 to 1972.

Early life and education 
Choe was born in Taechon County (태천군) in North Pyongan, Korea, in 1900. He was educated at two military academies.

Career 
Choe's first military deployment was to fight the Chinese Northern Expedition of 1927. He also took part in the Canton Communist riots in December later that year. He moved to Manchuria to form a guerrilla organization and military academy school to trained the anti-Japanese guerrilla army. Choe joined the Chinese Communist Party and the Northeast Anti-Japanese United Army in 1936.

He led a guerrilla unit against the Japanese after they occupied Manchuria (Manchukuo) in September 1931. In 1940, Choe and his troops had fled to the Soviet-Manchurian border in the Soviet Union and participated with the 88th Independent Brigade of the Soviet Army.

In 1945, he returned to Korea after Japan was defeated in World War II.

In 1946, he became the chairman of the Korean Democratic Party (KDP) and led this organization to a pro-communist course. He was, however, concurrently secretly a member of the ruling Workers' Party of Korea and tasked with keeping the KDP from becoming an independent political force. Afterwards, he came into more promotions and by February 1948, he was appointed the Supreme Commander of the Korean People's Army. When the Democratic People's Republic of Korea was established in Pyongyang on September 9, 1948, he was appointed the Minister of National Security. He was in fact the senior field commander for all the North Korean armies during the Korean War, from the first invasion of South Korea in June 1950 till the Korean Armistice Agreement was signed in July 1953.

In 1953, Choe was promoted to Vice Marshal and was made the Minister of Defence. In September 1957, he was removed from his position as Minister of Defense and made the President of the Presidium of the Supreme People's Assembly, a largely ceremonial position. In this post, he was North Korea's nominal head of state. He was appointed as Vice President by the Supreme People's Assembly in 1972 and he left the office in 1974. He died in Pyongyang in 1976. Following his death he was given a state funeral.

Personal life 
In his memoirs, Hwang Jang-yop,  a former chairman of the Supreme People's Assembly who defected to South Korea said Choe was famous for being very hard to have close relations with, but in reality he was not that strict.

In 1970 there were reports of his deteriorating health, and after attending in November 1970 the KWP Congress and retaining his Vice-Marshal position, he departed for treatment in the German Democratic Republic.

Works

See also
 Kim Kwang-hyop
 Kim Il-sung
 Zhou Baozhong

References

|-

|-

|-

1900 births
1976 deaths
North Korean atheists
Korean communists
People from Taechon County
Korean Social Democratic Party politicians
Heads of state of North Korea
Vice presidents of North Korea
North Korean generals
North Korean military personnel of the Korean War
Chairmen of the Presidium of the Supreme People's Assembly
Kim Won-bong
Defence ministers of North Korea
Vice Chairmen of the Workers' Party of Korea and its predecessors
Members of the 1st Supreme People's Assembly
Members of the 2nd Supreme People's Assembly
Members of the 3rd Supreme People's Assembly
Members of the 4th Supreme People's Assembly
Members of the 5th Supreme People's Assembly
People of 88th Separate Rifle Brigade